The 2007 Munich speech was given by Russian president Vladimir Putin in Germany on 10 February 2007 at the Munich Security Conference. The speech expressed significant points of future politics of Russia driven by Putin.

Synopsis 
Putin criticized what he called the United States' monopolistic dominance in global relations, and its "almost uncontained hyper use of force in international relations". The speech came to be known, especially in Russia, as the Munich speech. He said the result of such dominance was that,

Putin quoted a 1990 speech by Manfred Wörner to support his position that NATO promised not to expand into new countries in Eastern Europe:

Although NATO was still a year away from inviting Ukraine and Georgia to become NATO member-states in 2008, Putin emphasized how Russia perceived eastward expansion as a threat:

Putin also publicly opposed plans for the U.S. missile shield in Europe, and presented President George W. Bush with a counter proposal on 7 June 2007 which was declined. Russia suspended its participation in the Treaty on Conventional Armed Forces in Europe on 11 December 2007 because:

Response 
In response, former NATO secretary Jaap de Hoop Scheffer called it, "disappointing and not helpful." The months following the Munich speech were marked by tension and a surge in rhetoric on both sides of the Atlantic, though both Russian and American officials, however, denied the idea of a new Cold War.

The Polish Institute of International Affairs has described Putin's quotation from Manfred Wörner's speech as lacking appropriate context, stating that Wörner's speech "in fact, only concerned non-deployment of NATO forces on East German territory after reunification."

Legacy
In the run-up to and following the launch of the 2022 Russian invasion of Ukraine, the speech was revisited, with some commentators arguing it to be a revealing moment of Putin's later intentions. According to Andrew A. Michta, Western leaders failed in 2007 to recognize the speech "amounted to a declaration of war on the West." Other commentators, like John Mearsheimer and Stephen F. Cohen, would cite it as Putin's most explicit warning that Russia perceived NATO's eastward expansion as a threat to its national security.

Follow-ups 
Putin later made other speeches that were called follow-ups to the Munich speech. These include:

 The 2013 Valdai speech of Vladimir Putin in Sochi on 19 September 2013
 The Crimean speech of Vladimir Putin to the Federal Assembly of Russia on 18 March 2014 
 The 2014 Valdai speech of Vladimir Putin in Sochi on 24 October 2014
 The 2015 U. N. General Assembly speech of Vladimir Putin in New York on 28 September 2015 ("I'm urged to ask those who created this situation: do you at least realize now what you’ve done?")

See also 
 Foreign policy of Vladimir Putin
 European Security Treaty

References

External links 

 Video of the speech with English subtitles
 Tenth Anniversary of Putin’s Munich Speech: A Commitment to Failure — Jamestown Foundation, 2017
 The Daily Vertical: 10 Years Ago Today, Putin Declared War (Transcript) — RFERL, 2017

2007 in Germany
2007 in Russia
2007 in international relations
2007 speeches
Events in Munich
February 2007 events in Europe
Russia–NATO relations
Prelude to the 2022 Russian invasion of Ukraine
Speeches by Vladimir Putin
2000s in Munich